Danny Neville is an American college basketball coach, currently head men's basketball coach at the University of Jamestown in Jamestown, North Dakota.

Neville is from Bondurant, Iowa, where he attended Bondurant-Farrar High School. He played basketball there under his dad, Steve Neville, and broke several school records and went to the state tournament one time. After high school, he attended Grand View University where he played basketball. Over his last two years of playing, Grand View went 50–17, went to two national tournaments, and were at one time ranked No. 7 in the country. He graduated with a bachelor's degree in Sports Management, then went to Concordia University Irvine and received a master's degree in Athletic Administration. From there he went to Presentation College and was assistant basketball coach there until 2012 when he was hired as an assistant coach under Justin Wieck at the University of Jamestown where he served for three seasons.

In August 2015, Neville was named the head men's basketball coach of the University of Jamestown, replacing Alan Magnani who had been the head coach of the Jimmies for only one year. In the 2018–19 season, Jamestown moved from the North Star Athletic Association (NSAA) to the Great Plains Athletic Conference (GPAC). Since his hiring, the Jimmies have gone 105–55, won one NSAA regular season conference championship, and one GPAC tournament championship. In 2019, Jamestown made it to NAIA tournament for the first time in the Neville era and made it to the second round before losing to Spring Arbor University by a score of 81–85.

He has a wife named Erin, a daughter named Emma, and a son named Landon.

Head coaching record

References

Year of birth missing (living people)
Living people
American men's basketball players
College men's basketball head coaches in the United States
Grand View Vikings men's basketball players
Jamestown Jimmies men's basketball coaches
People from Polk County, Iowa
Basketball coaches from Iowa
Basketball players from Iowa